St Michael's College (French: Collège Saint-Michel) is a Roman Catholic secondary school located in Etterbeek (Brussels). The school was built in 1905 by the Society of Jesus in order to replace the previous school that had become too small. It is situated next to the Jesuit administered Saint John Berchmans Church.

History
The current St Michael's College is chronologically the third college to be built:

The first college 
The Jesuits have been in Brussels since 1586. By the request of Albert VII, Archduke of Austria (1559-1621) and Isabella Clara Eugenia (1566-1633) the Jesuits agreed to open a college. Inaugurated on July 14, 1604, the college is composed of a large rectangle formed by the Rue de la Paille (Straw Road), the Rue de Ruysbroeck (Ruysbroeck Road) and the Rue d'Or (Golden Road). The Jesuits were ejected from the school in 1773 and it was demolished in 1891.

The second college

In 1814, the Jesuits returned to Belgium and opened the French-speaking St Michael's College 19 years later in the Chapel Church area of the city. In 1905, the expanding population forced the Jesuits to not only expand the college but to also look for a location for a new college. In 1905, the college on Ursuline Street (Dutch: Ursulinenstraat) was renamed as St John Berchmans College and the new college in the Etterbeek part of the city became St Michael's College.

The third college

In 1905, building on the new St Michael's college was complete and work on the nearby church started. It was built in the same neo-traditional architectural style as the rest of the school buildings. The college welcomed 400 students, of which 100 were boarders, on October 3rd of that same year. On 20 July 1908, the foundation stone of the church was laid by the Papal nuncio to Belgium, Msg. Giovanni Tacci Porcelli. The architect was Joseph Prémont who was inspired by the Rhenan Romanesque tradition of the Middle Ages. It was consecrated on 9 July 1912 by the Bishop of Galle, Joseph van Reeth SJ.

Starting in the late 1930s, a shift in language was made which would result in St John Berchmans College speaking Dutch and English and the French-speaking section of the college being transferred to St Michael's College. The two separate colleges still exist today, each teaching in their respective language.

Notable students  
Notable former students the old St Michael's College:
 Ferdinand Perier (1875–1968), former professor at the college, Archbishop of Calcutta (1924–1960)
 Hubert Pierlot (1883–1963), Prime Minister of Belgium (1939–1945)

Notable former students of the new St Michael's College:
 Georges Lemaître, (1894–1966), physicist and astronomer, considered the founder of the Big Bang theory
 Paul Grosjean (1900–1964), Jesuit priest and scholar
 André Waterkeyn, (1917–2005), engineer, creator of the Atomium
 Archduke Rudolf of Austria (1919–2010)
 Jacques van Ypersele de Strihou (1936–) Chief of Staff of Kings Baudouin and Albert II
 François Weyergans, (1941–), writer and academician
 Charles Picqué, (1948–), politician
 Olivier Maingain, (1958–), member of the House of Representatives and Mayor of Woluwe-St-Lambert
 Philippe of Belgium (1960–)
 Prince Laurent of Belgium (1963–)
 Olivier Minne, (1967–), television host, producer and actor

Gallery

See also
 List of Jesuit sites in Belgium
 Archdiocese of Mechelen–Brussels
 Saint John Berchmans Church, Brussels

References

External links
 St Michael College site

Etterbeek
Secondary schools in Brussels
Michael
Educational institutions established in 1905
1905 establishments in Belgium